is one of the Geiyo Islands in the Seto Inland Sea, belonging to Hiroshima Prefecture in Japan. Ikuchi-jima is administered as part of Onomichi city. The bridges connecting Ikuchi-jima to the mainland (Honshū) via Innoshima and to Shikoku via Ōmishima Island.

History
 April 1, 1889, Ikuchi-juma was formally demarcated into Nishiikuchi-gun, Kitaikuchi-gun, Myōga-gun and Minamiikuchi-gun
 April 1, 1937, Nishiikuchi-gun merged into Setoda.
 April 1, 1944, Kitaikuchi-gun and Myōga-gun merged into Setoda.
 April 1, 1955, Minamiikuchi-gun merged into Setoda.
 July 27, 1970, Bridge connection to Takane Island opened.
 December 8, 1991, Bridge connection to Innoshima and Ōmishima.
 January 10, 2006, Setoda, along with the city of Innoshima, was merged into the expanded city of Onomichi

Attractions
 Outdoor island-wide monument park
 Hiking and cycling routes
 Sunset-view beach hotels
 Lemon orchards -Ikuchijima is known as "Lemon Island" in Japan.

Climate

See also

This article incorporates material from Japanese Wikipedia page 生口島, accessed 11 June 2018

References

Islands of Hiroshima Prefecture
Islands of the Seto Inland Sea